Mashreq (formerly Sharaf DG until 2020) is a rapid transit station on the Red Line of the Dubai Metro in Dubai, UAE. |  It is located on Sheikh Zayed Road, serving the areas of Al Barsha and Al Sufouh.

History
Mashreq station was renamed from Sharaf DG on 18 May 2020. Subsequently, Al Fahidi station was renamed to Sharaf DG on 24 November 2020.

Station layout
Mashreq station has two side platforms and two tracks.

Platform layout

References

Railway stations in the United Arab Emirates opened in 2010
Dubai Metro stations